Postal codes in Pakistan were introduced on 1 January 1988 to speed sortation and delivery. These codes are for the delivery post office in whose jurisdiction the residential, office, industrial, rural, or PO Box address falls. Non-delivery post offices also are assigned pseudo-codes for audit and accounting purpose, but these are for internal Pakistan Post use only.
Moreover, Pakistan Post Office is one of the oldest government departments in the South Asia. In 1947, it began functioning as the Department of Post and Telegraph. In 1962 it was separated from the Telegraph & Telephone and started working as an independent post office.

The following is the list of some of the postcodes within the country. GPO stands for General Post Office, the main post office in the city. For larger cities (Karachi and Lahore), there are a number of GPOs; however, the main one is the only one which has just the city's name attached to it (Karachi GPO and Lahore GPO).

External links
Pakistan Postal Codes | All Cities
Pakistan Post Codes by city
Pakistan Post Codes

Postal Codes
Pakistan
Postal system of Pakistan